Talang (also Romanized as Teleng; also known as Taland and Telenk) is a village in Talang Rural District, Talang District, Qasr-e Qand County, Sistan and Baluchestan Province, Iran. Its population was recorded 374 in the 2006 census, which consists of 70 families

References 

Populated places in Qasr-e Qand County